Sarah Jamieson (born 24 March 1975 in Perth) is an Australian middle distance runner.

Achievements

Personal bests
800 metres - 2:02.81 (1999)
1500 metres - 4:00.93 (2006)
One mile run - 4:23.40 (2007)
3000 metres - 8:48.41 (2007)
5000 metres - 15:02.90 (2006)

External links

1975 births
Living people
Australian female middle-distance runners
Athletes (track and field) at the 2000 Summer Olympics
Athletes (track and field) at the 2004 Summer Olympics
Athletes (track and field) at the 2008 Summer Olympics
Athletes (track and field) at the 2006 Commonwealth Games
Olympic athletes of Australia
Athletes from Perth, Western Australia
Commonwealth Games silver medallists for Australia
Commonwealth Games medallists in athletics
20th-century Australian women
21st-century Australian women
Medallists at the 2006 Commonwealth Games